The women's mass start competition of the Biathlon World Championships 2012 was held on March 11, 2012 at 16:00 local time.

Results 
The race started at 16:00.

References

Biathlon World Championships 2012
2012 in German women's sport